Union Bank, a wholly owned subsidiary of Union Bankshares, Inc., is a U.S. community bank based in Morrisville, Vermont. The bank provides commercial, retail, and municipal banking services and asset management services throughout Northern Vermont and New Hampshire. The bank operates 20 branches, three loan centers and several ATMs in the region.

History

Union Bank was founded in 1891 and it was formerly known as The Union Savings Bank and Trust Company until changing its name to Union Bank in 1974. In 1983, Union Bank was incorporated in Vermont and became a registered bank holding company. It maintains its headquarters in Morrisville, Vermont and is a full-service financial institution, offering financial services for consumers, businesses, and municipalities.

Vermont locations of the bank include Danville, Fairfax, Hardwick, Jeffersonville, Johnson, Lyndonville, Shelburne, St. Albans, Stowe, and Williston. New Hampshire locations include Groveton, Lincoln, Littleton, and North Woodstock. Loan Centers are located in South Burlington, Barre and Newport, VT.

In 2019, the St. Johnsbury branch was used as a set for the Ron Howard file Apple Seed.

Operations
The bank focuses on traditional community banking activities, taking deposits and making loans. The bank originates loans for marketplace lenders and processes payments. As of June 2022, the bank has assets of approximately $1.2billion and employs more than 200 employees throughout its branch offices and corporate headquarters in Vermont and New Hampshire.

Services
Union Bank offers checking and savings accounts, personal and business loans, asset management, cash management, and merchant services.

Community involvement
As part of its mission, Union Bank regularly participates in and supports community-centric events in the areas it serves. This has included events and programs focused on cancer, education, arts and culture, professional development, human services, public and societal benefit and more. One example is Union Bank’s funding for Copley Health Systems, where it donates to its annual fundraising event and supports special campaigns.

References

Banks based in Vermont
Banks established in 1891